Charles Merrill may refer to:

 Charles Merrill (businessman) (1792–1872), American entrepreneur and lumber company owner
 Charles E. Merrill (1885–1956), American philanthropist, stockbroker and co-founder of Merrill Lynch & Company
 Charles E. Merrill, Jr. (1920–2017), American educator, author and philanthropist
 Charles Merton Merrill (1907–1996), United States federal judge
 Charles Washington Merrill (1869–1958), American mining metallurgist
 Charles Merrill Hough (1858–1927), federal judge in New York City